Jack London Square is an entertainment and business destination on the waterfront of Oakland, California, United States. Named after the author Jack London and owned by the Port of Oakland, it is the home of stores, restaurants, hotels, Amtrak's Jack London Square station, a San Francisco Bay Ferry ferry dock, the historic Heinold's First and Last Chance Saloon, the (re-located) cabin where Jack London lived in the Klondike, and a movie theater.  A farmer's market is hosted among the retail shops on Sunday mornings. The former presidential yacht USS Potomac is moored at an adjacent slip.

History
The area between Broadway, Webster, First Street (Embarcadero) and the estuary was named Jack London Square in 1951. On May 1, 1951, the area was formally dedicated and a plaque placed at the foot of Broadway.

Geography
Jack London Square is located at the south end of Broadway, across the Oakland Estuary from Alameda.

The name has also come to refer to the formerly industrial neighborhood surrounding Jack London Square now known as the Jack London District, which has undergone significant rehabilitation in the last decade, including loft conversions and new construction.

Former California Governor (and former Oakland mayor) Jerry Brown made his home here before moving north to the Uptown neighborhood.

Tenants and businesses
KTVU (Channel 2), the Bay Area's Fox affiliate, has had studios at the Square since it began broadcasting on March 3, 1958, and the offices of the Port of Oakland are located there as well. The Square was also the temporary home of the Oakland Tribune from 1989 to 1996 after the newspaper was forced to abandon the landmark downtown Tribune Tower due to damage it sustained in the 1989 Loma Prieta earthquake.

Other businesses at Jack London Square range from the Oakland Athletics team headquarters and software firm Navis LLC, to restaurants such as Farmhouse, Noka Ramon, Scott's Seafood and Yoshi's restaurant and jazz club. California Canoe & Kayak retail and kayak rental shop has been located in Jack London Square since 1993.

Railways and transit
A mainline railroad runs through the middle of Embarcadero West, with the train speed limit set at 15 mph (25 km/h). Trains served 16th Street station until earthquake damage in 1989; afterwards, that station was replaced in 1994 by the present-day Jack London Square station. The tracks running through Jack London Square are used by BNSF Railway, Capitol Corridor, Coast Starlight, San Joaquin, and Union Pacific Railroad. The trains share the road with automobiles, AC Transit buses, and pedestrians. A second Transbay Tube may include a BART station at the square. Another possibility is an aerial tramway to BART stations in downtown Oakland.

Design and development
Jack London Square's most recent changes are adding more businesses, restaurants, and entertainment. Under lead developer Ellis Partners, Jack London Square's new architecture and public spaces are adding to the daytime and nighttime population and use. Recent new components include the 55 Harrison building, a  mid-rise by RMW Architects in association with Steve Worthington.  The public spaces by SWA Group extended the city to the waterfront by adding accessible waterfront spaces supporting a variety of programs and events from farmers markets to the popular festivals and events.

See also
 Jack London District, Oakland, California
 Chinatown, Oakland, California
 Old Oakland

References

External links 

 
 The Jack London District Association
 The Jack London News

Neighborhoods in Oakland, California
Redeveloped ports and waterfronts in the United States
Lincoln Highway
Street running
Tourist attractions in Oakland, California
Shopping districts and streets in the San Francisco Bay Area
Jack London
San Francisco Bay Trail